Álvaro Sierra Peña (born 4 April 1967) is a Colombian former professional road racing cyclist.

Major results

1988
 6th Overall Vuelta a Colombia
1st Stages 3 & 8
1990
 5th Overall Vuelta a Colombia
1991
 1st  Overall Vuelta a Colombia
1st Stage 8
1992
 5th Subida a Urkiola
1993
 4th Overall Clásico RCN
1st Stage 6 
 8th Overall Vuelta a Colombia  
1994
 2nd Overall Vuelta a Colombia
 3rd Overall Vuelta y Ruta de Mexico
 4th Overall Clásico RCN
1995
 3rd Overall Vuelta a Colombia
1996
 6th Overall Clásico RCN
1997
 7th Overall Clásico RCN 
 7th Overall Vuelta a Colombia
1998
 1st  Overall Vuelta a Antioquia
 1st  Overall Vuelta a Boyacá
 5th Overall Clásico RCN
1st Stage 9
1999
 1st  Overall Vuelta a Boyacá
 2nd Overall Clásico RCN
1st Stage 3
 7th Overall Vuelta a Colombia
2000
 2nd Overall Vuelta a Boyacá
1st Stage 2
 3rd Overall Vuelta a Venezuela
 5th Overall Clásico RCN
2001
 1st  Overall Vuelta a Boyacá
2002
 1st Stage 4 Vuelta al Tolima
 2nd Overall Vuelta a Boyacá
2003
 1st  Overall Doble Sucre Potosí GP Cemento Fancesa
 1st  Overall Doble Copacabana GP Fides
1st Stages 3 & 4
 1st Overall Clasica Integración de la Guadua-Gobernación de Risaralda
1st Stage 1
 2nd Overall Vuelta a Antioquia
1st Stage 4
 2nd Overall Clásico RCN
 3rd Overall Vuelta a Colombia
 3rd Overall Vuelta a Costa Rica
1st Stages 7 & 10
2004
 1st  Overall Vuelta a Cundinamarca
1st Stage 2
 1st  Overall Clásica Club Deportivo Boyacá
 5th Overall Clásico RCN
2005
 1st  Overall Doble Sucre Potosí GP Cemento Fancesa
1st Mountains classification
1st Stages 1 & 2
 1st Stage 3 Vuelta a Boyacá
 2nd Overall Clásico RCN
 3rd Overall Vuelta a Colombia
 3rd Overall GP Cootranspensilvania
 5th Overall Doble Copacabana GP Fides
1st Mountains classification
1st Stage 4
2006
 2nd Overall Doble Sucre Potosí GP Cemento Fancesa 
 3rd Overall Vuelta a Colombia
1st Stages 8 & 14
 3rd Overall Doble Copacabana GP Fides
1st Stage 4
 6th Overall Clásico RCN 
2007
 3rd Overall Doble Sucre Potosí GP Cemento Fancesa
2008
 2nd Overall Vuelta al Ecuador
 2nd Overall Vuelta a Cundinamarca
 3rd Overall Vuelta a Bolivia
1st Stage 7b (ITT)
 4th Overall Vuelta a Boyacá

References
 

1967 births
Living people
People from Sogamoso
Colombian male cyclists
Vuelta a Colombia stage winners
Sportspeople from Boyacá Department